Fred van Leer (born 18 September 1976) is a Dutch stylist and presenter. Van Leer is best known for mentoring and judging on the Dutch television program Holland's Next Top Model. In 2020, van Leer was appointed as host for the Dutch adaptation of the American RuPaul's Drag Race.

Career
From age 19 until 28, van Leer worked as a stylist at  club nights.

During the 1990s and the 2000s, van Leer was one of the most prominent drag queens in the Netherlands.

In the early 2010s, van Leer started appearing on various television programs, including Holland's Next Top Model, Say Yes to the Dress Benelux, and since 2020, he acts as host in Drag Race Holland.

Personal life
Van Leer is openly gay.

Filmography

Television

Film

Web series

Theatre

References

1976 births
Living people
Drag Race Holland
Dutch television presenters
Dutch gay men
Dutch drag queens
People from Alblasserdam
21st-century Dutch LGBT people